Smolnik is a dispersed settlement in the Municipality of Ruše in northeastern Slovenia. It extends from the right bank of the Drava River just west of Ruše into the Pohorje Hills. The area is part of the traditional region of Styria. The municipality is now included in the Drava Statistical Region.

Church

The local church is dedicated to the Virgin Mary and belongs to the Parish of Ruše. It was built in the Baroque style between 1859 and 1861.

References

External links
Smolnik at Geopedia

Populated places in the Municipality of Ruše